The Violoncello Concerto is a concerto for cello and orchestra by the American composer Christopher Rouse.  It was commissioned to celebrate the 75th anniversary of the Los Angeles Philharmonic by philanthropist Betty Freeman—to whom the work is dedicated—and completed October 27, 1992.  The piece was premiered in Los Angeles, January 26, 1994, with conductor David Zinman leading cellist Yo-Yo Ma and the Los Angeles Philharmonic.

Composition
Similar to Rouse's previous Violin Concerto, the Violoncello Concerto is composed in two movements:
Combattimento
Adagiati

The movements are titled from the works of innovative Renaissance/Baroque composer Claudio Monteverdi.  Additionally, the piece contains quotes from Monteverdi's opera L'incoronazione di Poppea and William Schuman's song Orpheus with his Lute.  Edgar Allan Poe's poem "The Conqueror Worm" was also placed in the score as a motto for the piece.

Inspiration
Rouse described the Violoncello Concerto as a "meditation upon death" in response to the passing of several colleagues and fellow composers.  In the program note to the score, Rouse wrote:

Reception
Reviewing the world premiere, Edward Rothstein of The New York Times praised "marvelous effects" of Rouse's composition, despite noting its somber tone.  Rothstein further remarked, "The danger in his style is partly that the anger and despair can seem motivated by events outside the music more than by events within it. But when it works -- as it does in his Violin Concerto and in the Cello Concerto -- one is drawn into Mr. Rouse's emotional universe and is moved by its craft as well."

Conversely, Ivan Hewett of BBC Music Magazine was much more critical and referred to the concerto as "mediocre music."

References

Concertos by Christopher Rouse
1992 compositions
Rouse
20th-century classical music
Music commissioned by the Los Angeles Philharmonic